WESM (91.3 FM) is a listener-supported public radio station located on the Eastern Shore of Maryland. The station broadcasts a variety of formats, including jazz, news and information, blues, world, American folk music, and gospel programming. WESM is also an affiliate of National Public Radio, Public Radio Exchange, American Public Media and other network program providers.

Licensed to Princess Anne, Maryland, United States, the station is currently owned and operated by the University of Maryland Eastern Shore. WESM 91.3 FM began broadcasting in March 1987.

Broadcasting at approximately 50,000 watts, WESM's FM signal covers most of the lower Delmarva Peninsula, including the Eastern Shores of Maryland & Virginia, Sussex County, Delaware, and portions of Southern Maryland & Virginia's Northern Neck.

The station typically holds semi-annual membership drives in the spring and fall to help offset operational costs. These drives usually last less than ten days.

See also
 List of jazz radio stations in the United States

External links 
 WESM 91.3 FM official website
 
 
 

ESM
NPR member stations
Jazz radio stations in the United States
University of Maryland Eastern Shore
Radio stations established in 1988
1988 establishments in Maryland